Maiden Newton railway station is a railway station serving the village of Maiden Newton in Dorset, England. The station is located on the Heart of Wessex,  from the zero point at London Paddington, measured via Swindon and Westbury.

History

The station consisted of two platforms with a flint station building and goods shed at the south end.  A signal box was added later - it was closed in the summer of 1988, when the "no signalman token system" was introduced between Maiden Newton and Yeovil. From 1857 to 1975 the station was the junction for the Bridport Railway and an extra bay platform was added at the north end of the station for these trains.  This can still be seen at the west end of the station and this end of the trackbed is a footpath and cycleway.

The station is Grade II listed. The main station building was built for the opening of the station and although in the style of Isambard Kingdom Brunel is most likely to designs by his assistant Robert Pearson Brereton. It is constructed of flint with Hamstone dressings and an artificial slate roof. The other buildings within the listing include a smaller shelter with Welsh slate roof, and the footbridge of reinforced concrete installed in the 1950s by the Western Region of British Railways.

The station building survives but is no longer used by the railway.

Stationmasters

Frederick Harvey Aldrich 1857 (suspended in September 1857 for dispatching a train contrary to the regulations)
William Matthew Mitcham 1860 - 1863 (afterwards station master at )
John George Girling 1863 - 1866 (afterwards station master at )
William Edward Bock 1866 - 1869 (formerly station master at Bruton) 
Henry Yeo ca. 1871 - 1876 (afterwards station master at Dorchester)
William Lambourne Thompson Gray 1876 - 1881 (afterwards station master at )
Arthur Percy Dagg 1881 - 1882 (afterwards station master at Bruton)
Alfred Reeves 1882 - ca. 1888
Frederick William Cooper 1897 (afterwards station master at )
Edward Charles Beard 1897 - 1899 (afterwards station master at Melksham)
Frank George Dunford 1901 - ca. 1906 (formerly station master at )
Walter George Stickland ca. 1914 (formerly station master at )
J. Ralph from 1926
Walter Edward Ernest Pidding from 1933
Mr. Powell ca. 1936 ca. 1937
L.E. Hole 1941 - 1944 (afterwards station master at )
J.H. MacMahon 1944 - 1957

Description

The station retains two platforms as it is a passing place on the single line between Dorchester West and Yeovil. The entrance is on the northbound platform, the side closest to the village. Access to the southbound platform is normally by the footbridge but there is a level crossing at the south end of the station for passengers who are unable to use the bridge.

Services

Signalling 
The electric key token instrument for the block section to Yeovil are now operated by the train crew under the supervision of the signal operator based at Yeovil Pen Mill. The block section to Dorchester West is operated under the "tokenless single line" principle with track circuiting.

References

Further reading

External links
 Bridport Trailway

Railway stations in Dorset
Railway stations in Great Britain opened in 1857
Former Great Western Railway stations
Railway stations served by Great Western Railway
1857 establishments in England
Grade II listed buildings in Dorset
DfT Category F1 stations